Harry Malcolm Wellmon (May 15, 1883 - July 17, 1945) sometimes known as H. W. Wellmon, was an American-British jazz age conductor and composer who lived in London, England.  He was part of the song-writing team of Carlish and Wellmon.

Biography
He was born in Shelby, North Carolina on May 15, 1883, to Andrew Wellmon. By 1918 he was living in New York City and working at Sulzer's Harlem River Casino. He moved to London and married singer Lavinia Elizabeth Jeffs on April 16, 1919. He returned to New York City in 1938. He died on July 17, 1945, in Manhattan, New York City.

Style
A 1921 review in Musical America described Wellmon conducting the Southern Syncopated Orchestra in France as

"...a superbly vigorous conductor in the uniform of a Brazilian general, wearing dazzling white gloves and green shoes, leads this heterogenous instrumental ensemble. He uses no score, and at times marches straight into his orchestra to stimulate some player who seems to lag; at others, when all is going as it should, he lowers his baton, and, hands behind his back, looks at the public with eyes twinkling with satisfaction ..."

Compositions
The Good Old British Isles (1906) 
The Fascée Dance (1914)

References

1883 births
1945 deaths
American emigrants to England